New Heliopolis is a large 5400 acre real estate development located in the satellite city of Shorouk, Cairo, Egypt. Land for the development was allocated by the Presidential Decree 193/1995 to the Heliopolis Company for Housing and Development, making it the company's largest land allocation since it bought its original 6100 acre plot to build the Heliopolis Oasis in 1905.

The development has sold plots to individuals, as well sold to, or partnered with companies to build gated communities, reducing the area under the company's ownership by 2021 to just under 4000 acres.

Location
New Heliopolis is connected by the Cairo-Ismailia road from the north and by the Cairo–Suez road from the south. It also borders Madinaty to the south, the original settlement of El Shorouk to the west and the satellite city of Badr to the east. The development benefits from its connection to the Regional Ring Road which links it to all of Greater Cairo. It is located 25 minutes from the district of Heliopolis and Nasr City.

Climate
Köppen-Geiger climate classification system classifies its climate as hot desert (BWh), as the rest of Egypt.

See also

 Badr
 Cairo Electric Railways and Heliopolis Oases Company
 El Shorouk
 Greater Cairo
 Heliopolis style

References

External links 
 Satellite OverView New Heliopolis City Wikimapia Website.

Geography of Cairo
Populated places in Cairo Governorate
Cities in Egypt
New towns in Egypt